Lantarnam Hall is a historic mansion in Los Altos Hills, California. It was built in 1914 to 1916 for Percy Morgan, a director of Wells Fargo and trustee of Stanford University. The house was later repurposed as a school.

The house was designed by architect John H. Powers in the Tudor Revival style. It has been listed on the National Register of Historic Places since December 19, 1985.

References

Houses on the National Register of Historic Places in California
National Register of Historic Places in Santa Clara County, California
Tudor Revival architecture in the United States
Houses completed in 1916